Love Hotel in Tyrol (German: Love-Hotel in Tirol) is a 1978 Austrian-West German sex comedy film directed by Franz Antel and starring Erich Padalewski, Teri Tordai and Fritz Muliar.

Cast
Erich Padalewski as Peter Berger / Paul Berger 
Teri Tordai as Caroline 
Fritz Muliar as mayor Katzinger 
Ida Krottendorf as Wally Katzinger 
Iris Lohner as Susi Berg 
Heinz Reincke as prosecutor 
Rolf Olsen as Father Zwickauer 
Anna Marcella as Antje 
Marianne Chappuis as Rübenzahls Sekretärin 
Marianne Haas as Burgl 
Marte Harell as Sister Angelika 
Werner Röglin as André 
Victor Couzyn
Elisabeth Stiepl as Olga Rübenzahl 
Gerti Schneider as Rosl 
Uschi Zech as Christa 
Rinaldo Talamonti as Peppino 
Jacques Herlin as Armin Rübenzahl
Renate Langer as convent participant
Claudia Mehringer as convent participant

References

External links

1970s sex comedy films
Austrian sex comedy films
German sex comedy films
West German films
Films directed by Franz Antel
Films scored by Gerhard Heinz
Films set in hotels
Films set in the Alps
Films about twin brothers
1970s German-language films
1970s German films